Urmarsky District (Vărmar rayonĕ) is an administrative and municipal district (raion), one of the twenty-one in the Chuvash Republic, Russia. It is located in the northeast of the republic and borders with Kozlovsky District in the north, Tsivilsky District in the northwest, Yantikovsky District in the south, and with Kanashsky District in the west. Its administrative center is the urban locality (an urban-type settlement) of Urmary. Population:  The population of Urmary accounts for 22.5% of the district's total population.

History
The district was established on 5 September 1927.
The well-known Chuvash author and literary critic Dimitri Isayev was born in Kovali, Urmarsky District.

Demographics
97% of the population is ethnic Chuvash.

References

Notes

Sources

Districts of Chuvashia